Álvaro Cardoso Pereira (born 7 November 1904 - deceased), former Portuguese footballer who played as a midfielder.

Football career 

Pereira gained 7 caps for Portugal and made his debut 30 November 1930 in Porto against Spain, in a 0-1 defeat.

External links 
 
 

1904 births
Portuguese footballers
Association football midfielders
Primeira Liga players
FC Porto players
Portugal international footballers
Year of death missing